Dr. Anup Singh (5 March 190328 January 1969) was an Indian politician from Punjab belonging to the Indian National Congress party. He received his doctorate from Harvard University.

He was a member of Rajya Sabha for four terms: 3 April 1952 to 2 April 1954, 3 April 1954 to 2 April 1960, 3 April 1962 to 22 November 1962 and 3 April 1964 to 28 January 1969.

During 1960 he was Chairman of the Punjab Public Service Commission. He wrote a book entitled Nehru: Rising Star of India.

He is survived by Shrimati Iqbal Kaur and one daughter.

References

Rajya Sabha members from Punjab, India
1903 births
1969 deaths
Harvard University alumni
Indian National Congress politicians from Punjab, India